Moussadou  is a town and sub-prefecture in the Beyla Prefecture in the Nzérékoré Region of south-eastern Guinea.

Kékorocissédou or Kekorocissedou is one of the historical villages in sub-prefecture of Moussadou. It was established by Aboubacar Cissé, commonly known as Kékoro.

References

Sub-prefectures of the Nzérékoré Region